Kalyan is an Indian choreographer who has primarily worked on Tamil and Telugu language films as well as Hindi, Malayalam and Kannada films.. After beginning his career as a dancer and actor, he has gone on to choreograph songs in over two hundred films as a popular choreographer. He has also been a Judge in the popular reality TV dance shows Jodi Number One and Kings of Dance for Vijay TV.

Career
Kalyan began his career in the film industry as a dancer working with his great aunt, Puliyur Saroja. He made his debut as a dancer in the film Per Sollum Pillai (1987) and then worked as an assistant choreographer with her in many popular Tamil films of the 1980s. He also became an actor and portrayed a negative role in the college drama film, Kalloori Vaasal (1996) featuring Ajith Kumar, Prashanth and Pooja Bhatt. He then played an antagonist against actor Vijay in S. A. Chandrasekhar's Maanbumigu Maanavan (1996), before moving on to work primarily as a choreographer. Since 1996, he initially worked as an assistant under various dancers such as Chinni Prakash, Thara, Tharun and  Puliyur Saroja, before going on to choreograph songs in over 200 films. His first Tamil project as a main choreographer was Uyirodu Uyiraga (1999), and he made a breakthrough following his work in Dheena (2001). Kalyan has however continued to make acting appearances in films including Kattradhu Kalavu (2010) and Kannula Kaasa Kattappa (2016), which he co-produced. Kalyan has been a regular judge in the popular reality TV dance shows Jodi Number One and Kings of Dance for Vijay TV.

Filmography

Actor

Dancer

Choreographer

 1997 Uyirodu Uyiraga
 2001 Dheena
 2002 Thulluvadho Ilamai 2002 Villain 2003 Dhool 2003 Kadhal Kondein 2003 Saamy 2003 Enakku 20 Unakku 18 2003 Anjaneya 2003 Ottran 2004 Ghilli 2004 Vasool Raja MBBS 2004 Arasatchi 2004 7G Rainbow Colony 2004 Attahasam 2005 Sukran 2005 Aaru 2005 Anniyan 2005 Ghajini 2005 Aaru 2006 Paramasivan 2006 Pattiyal 2006 Pudhupettai 2007 Aalwar 2007 Chennai 600028 2007 Malaikottai 2007 Kireedam 2007 Polladhavan 2007 Billa 2008 Kuruvi 2008 Yaaradi Nee Mohini 2008 Saroja 2009 Sarvam 2010 Aayirathil Oruvan 2010 Goa 2010 Thamizh Padam 2010 Uthamaputhiran 2010 Va Quarter Cutting 2011 Siruthai 2011 Mappillai 2011 Mankatha 2011 Mayakkam Enna 2012 3 2013 Biriyani 2013 Irandaam Ulagam 2015 Massu Engira Masilamani 2015 Vedalam 2016 Chennai 600028 II: Second Innings 2016 Kannula Kaasa Kattappa 2017 Vivegam 2018 Thamizh Padam 2 2019 Viswasam 2019 RK Nagar 2019 NGK 2019 Nerkonda Paarvai 2023 Thunivu''

References

External links
 

Male actors in Tamil cinema
Indian film choreographers
Indian male film actors
Living people
Indian choreographers
20th-century Indian dancers
Year of birth missing (living people)